is a 1992 three-part anthology of Japanese ghost stories from director Hideo Nakata. The DVD version is being licensed and distributed by AsiaVision.

Story 

The movie consist of three storylines.

The Cursed Doll:

Satomi is being called by someone in her dreams. Following the voice, she discovers it's coming from a doll, which houses the spirit of her deceased sister.

The Spirit of the Dead:

A woman takes her son camping after her husband's death but was disrupted when a ghost of a woman thinks that the boy is her child.

The Haunted Inn: 

A spirit forces three girls who are on a vacation in a traditional Japanese inn, in which a tragedy had occurred a long time ago, to repeat the events of the day.

Cast & crew 

Screenplay: 
Hiroshi Takahashi
Akihiko Sit

Director: 
Hideo Nakata

Cast: 
Michiko Hata
Maiko Kawakami
Mitsuko Oka 
Yasuyo Shiratori
Yuma Nakamura
Miki Mizuno
Kyoko Enami

See also
List of ghost films

External links
 IMDb entry

1992 films
Films directed by Hideo Nakata
Fiction about curses
1990s Japanese films